For Those Who Think Young is a 1964 beach party film shot in Techniscope, directed by Leslie H. Martinson and featuring James Darren, Pamela Tiffin, Paul Lynde, Tina Louise, Bob Denver, Nancy Sinatra, Robert Middleton, Ellen Burstyn (billed as Ellen McRae), Claudia Martin and Woody Woodbury.

Plot
Rich kid and party animal Gardner Pruitt III (James Darren), known as "Ding" to his friends, is on the prowl for a new conquest in the form of teenager Sandy Palmer (Pamela Tiffin). In the meantime, Ding's influential grandfather, B.S. Cronin (Robert Middleton) wants to curtail the romance and shut down a popular local college teen hangout.

Sandy's guardians Sid Hoyt (Paul Lynde) and Woody Woodbury (playing himself) get mixed up in the proceedings, with Woody becoming the college kid's hero at the hangout. That sends up a red flag to the college administration, which sends in Dr. Pauline Swenson to investigate allegations of underage drinking.

When the clever kids discover that ex-gangster Grandpa Cronin used to be a bootlegger, they blackmail him into keeping the club open.

Cast
James Darren 	... 	Gardner 'Ding' Pruitt III
Pamela Tiffin 	... 	Sandy Palmer
Paul Lynde         ... 	Uncle Sid Hoyt
Tina Louise 	... 	Topaz McQueen
Bob Denver 	... 	Kelp
Nancy Sinatra 	... 	Karen Cross
Robert Middleton 	... 	Burford B. Sanford 'Nifty' Cronin
Claudia Martin 	... 	Sue Lewis
Ellen Burstyn 	... 	Dr. Pauline Swenson (billed as Ellen McRae) 
Woody Woodbury 	... 	Uncle Woody Woodbury
Louis Quinn 	... 	Gus Kestler
Sammee Tong 	... 	Clyde
Jimmy Griffin  ...  Singer 
George Raft  ...  Detective Lieutenant
Roger Smith  ...  Smitty the Detective 
Addison Richards  ...  Dean Watkins  
Paul 'Mousie' Garner  ...  Mousie 
Benny Baker  ...  Lou  
Anna Lee  ...  Laura Pruitt  
Jack La Rue  ...  Cronin's Business Associate 
Allen Jenkins  ...  Col. Leslie Jenkins 
Robert Armstrong  ...  Norman Armstrong

Production
The film began as a script called A Young Man's Fancy. The rights were bought by Frank Sinatra's Essex Productions. The title was changed in order to secure funding participation from Pepsi Cola, who changed their slogan from "Be Sociable" (which had been used since 1958) to "Now It's Pepsi For Those Who Think Young". Besides Pepsi, the film featured extensive product placement for Jax Clothing, Baskin-Robbins, Peter Pan swimwear, Buick and Honda. Sam Arkoff of AIP later called the use of the title "the most ridiculous, hidebound, stupid concept I can think of. To put a middle aged slogan on a youth picture. What kid would go to see a film called For Those Who Think Young?"

Dolores Hart, James Darren, and Ann-Margret were all considered to star. Pamela Tiffin replaced Ann-Margret.

Filming began August 14, 1963 at Paramount Studios. The beach scenes were shot at Mailbu Beach, all in one day.

James Darren's character drives a 1963 Buick Riviera, designed by George Barris.

Music
Jerry Fielding, later famous for his television themes, composed the score for the film.

Mack David and Jerry Livingston wrote "For Those Who Think Love", sung by James Darren over the opening credits.

Bob Denver sings "Ho Daddy, Surf's Up" and "Ho Daddy, Surf's Up (Reprise)."

Jimmy Griffin (later founder member of the 1970s band Bread), performs the song "I'm Gonna Walk All Over This Land", accompanied by Paul Johnson (of The Bel-Airs), Glen Grey and Richard Delvy (both of The Challengers).

References

External links
 

1964 films
1964 comedy films
Beach party films
Films directed by Leslie H. Martinson
Films scored by Jerry Fielding
Films set in California
Films set in universities and colleges
United Artists films
1960s English-language films